Witold Józef Gintowt-Dziewałtowski (born 11 January 1949 in Drewnica) is a Polish politician. He was elected to the Sejm on 25 September 2005, getting 9389 votes in 34 Elbląg district as a candidate from Democratic Left Alliance list.

He was also a member of Sejm 1997-2001 and Sejm 2001-2005.

See also
Members of Polish Sejm 2005-2007

External links
Witold Gintowt-Dziewałtowski - parliamentary page - includes declarations of interest, voting record, and transcripts of speeches.

1949 births
Living people
Democratic Left Alliance politicians
Polish United Workers' Party members
Members of the Polish Sejm 2005–2007
Members of the Polish Sejm 1997–2001
Members of the Polish Sejm 2001–2005
Members of the Polish Sejm 2007–2011